The Rabenklippe is a granite rock formation in the Harz National Park. The name means "Raven Crag" and is very apt as ravens live in the vicinity.

Location 
The Rabenklippe is located in the Harz mountains of Germany, southeast of Bad Harzburg, above the Ecker valley, a few hundred metres away from the border between Lower Saxony and Saxony-Anhalt. Part of the crag has been made accessible with steps and railings. In good weather there is an excellent view of the Brocken, the highest mountain in the Harz.

There are crags by the Rappbode Reservoir called the Große Rabenklippe and Kleine Rabenklippe.

History 
The Rabenklippe became a popular walking destination in the 19th century. Immediately next to the crag a refuge hut was erected in 1874, the predecessor to today's forest tavern.

In the immediate vicinity of the cafe and the crag is the lynx enclosure built by the Harz National Park authority (see Harz National Park).

Hiking 
The Rabenklippe is on a hiking trail that can be accessed from Bad Harzburg via the Burgberg Cable Car. There is a checkpoint at the restaurant which is no. 170 in the Harzer Wandernadel system.

See also 
 Harzklippen - other rock formations in the Harz.

External links 
 Website of the cafe

Bad Harzburg

Rock formations of the Harz
Rock formations of Lower Saxony